This Is Why is the sixth studio album by American rock band Paramore, released on February 10, 2023, through Atlantic Records. It is the band's first album in nearly six years, following After Laughter (2017), as well as their first album to feature the same line-up as its predecessor. Three singles preceded the album: "This Is Why", "The News", and "C'est Comme Ça". The fourth single "Running Out of Time" was released after the album's release. This Is Why received universal acclaim from critics.

Background and recording 
In May 2017, Paramore released their fifth studio album After Laughter to critical acclaim. The album saw the return of former drummer Zac Farro, who had left the band in 2010. The band toured in support of the album from June 2017 until September 2018. Following the conclusion of the After Laughter Tour, the members of Paramore took a break from writing and recording music for the band and worked on other endeavors. Hayley Williams featured on the American Football song "Uncomfortably Numb" in 2019 and released two solo albums, Petals for Armor (2020) and Flowers for Vases / Descansos (2021); the former produced by Paramore guitarist Taylor York. She also pivoted her attention more towards her hair dye company Good Dye Young and hosted the weekly BBC Sounds series Everything Is Emo. Farro continued his ongoing project HalfNoise, releasing an extended play – Flowerss (2018) – and two albums – Natural Disguise (2019) and Motif (2021). Farro also recorded drums for the songs "Watch Me While I Bloom" and "Crystal Clear" from Williams' Petals for Armor and released an EP under his own name titled Zafari (2020).

Discussions about a sixth Paramore album began in 2020 while Williams was promoting Petals for Armor. Williams hinted that the band's next album would be more guitar-driven, stating, "We've found ourselves listening to a lot of older music that we grew up being inspired by." She further commented on the sound of the album in 2022, likening it to Bloc Party: “From day one, Bloc Party was the number one reference because there was such an urgency to their sound that was different to the fast punk or the pop-punk or the like, loud wall of sound emo bands that were happening in the early 2000s.” In January 2022, the band confirmed they had entered the studio to work on their sixth album.

Composition
This Is Why is the band's first album to have a title track. Logan Gourlay of Rock Sound called it a "jittery post-punk record" and noted Foals, Bloc Party and Talking Heads influences. George Griffiths of the Official Charts Company described the album as a "confidently jagged, hard post-punk soundscape." Meredith Jenks and Christine Werthman of Billboard have described the album as "a tight, post-punk juggernaut that zeroes in on pandemic-fueled anxieties". Similarly, Arielle Gordon from Pitchfork characterized the album as "jittery, crackling post-punk." Andrew Sacher at BrooklynVegan claimed the album has "twitchy" dance-punk "all over [it]." Wesley McLean of Exclaim considered the album to be "deeply rooted in post-punk and art punk traditions." According to Alexis Petridis of The Guardian, "[the album] stirs 00s alt-rock into the mix: the band have mentioned Bloc Party and Foals as influences." Ims Taylor of Clash stated that "Paramore opt for simple, striking, and forceful on ‘This Is Why’, keeping in that New Wave tradition of punchy phrases iterated and reiterated, through vivid guitar countermelodies, offbeat punctuation and pointed lyrical looping of lyrics that go beyond verse chorus verse chorus, searing each song’s character into your mind indelibly." The Sydney Morning Herald noted that "the album’s last three tracks swirl around a dream-pop axis." According to Chris Thiessen of Under the Radar, "The back half of the album feels tonally different from the front, more personal and relational and coming closer to their pop-punk roots." Maximo David of Boolin Tunes states "any notion that This Is Why is Paramore 'returning to their roots,' or whatever a number of pundits may have purported over the years is almost unequivocally false."

Release and promotion 

In September 2022, Paramore archived all posts on their official Instagram page and unveiled a new design for the website. The site featured a timeline of several dates throughout the month that would be updated each date. These dates saw the launch of the band's official Discord server, the announcement of new tour dates in Los Angeles and New York City, and video snippets of the band working on new material. On September 16, the band announced their first new single in four years, "This Is Why", which was released on September 28. The same day as the single's release, the band announced the album of the same name to be released on February 10, 2023. Paramore performed the single on The Tonight Show Starring Jimmy Fallon on November 4. On December 8, 2022, the band released the second single, "The News". The third single, "C’est Comme Ça" was released on January 12. The band embarked on a brief tour beginning in October, including headlining slots at the Austin City Limits and When We Were Young festivals. On February 6, 2023, the band debuted the song "Running Out of Time" at their album release show in Nashville. On February 16, 2023, the band released a music video for the album's fourth single, "Running Out of Time".

Critical reception 

This Is Why received widespread acclaim upon release. The album holds a score of 85 out of 100 on review aggregator Metacritic, based on 20 critics' reviews, indicating "universal acclaim". Writing for AllMusic, Matt Collar wrote that the album "[pulls] the artistic and emotional threads of their career into a cohesive, ardent whole." Ims Taylor of Clash praised the songwriting stating, "It's a disservice...to call any Paramore album the 'most' anything...But something about the songwriting on This Is Why are undeniably the most something, Williams both elegant and sandpaper-coarse, depending on what is called for." Sarah Jamieson of DIY called the album "another bold and brilliant transformation for the trio" with a "real sense of self-assuredness" that is "Paramore's most ambitious record yet". Writing for Evening Standard, David Smyth felt that the album "ranges from volcanic energy to slower tracks that suggest an appealing maturity."

Wesley McLean of Exclaim! called it "a record deeply rooted in post-punk and art punk traditions", and "Paramore's most mature release to date." Alexis Petridis of The Guardian wrote that on the album, "the agitated drumming and angular guitars meld with the big riffs and stop-start dynamics of pop-punk and an acute understanding of pop songcraft", concluding that it "tackles millennial malaise really well and realistically". Writing for Kerrang!, Sam Law opined that "the songwriting of these 10 tracks feel like a natural evolution" from the songs on After Laughter: "slightly older, slightly wiser, quite a lot more outraged at the state of the world". Law felt that Williams "tap[s] into the heightened version of her real persona" on This Is Why and commented that it is "remarkable how distinctly Paramore this still sounds". According to Steven Loftin writing for The Line of Best Fit, "Like all good jangling indie bops, beneath the fluctuations of chipper notes swims a dark underbelly, and This Is Why relishes in this fact."

Reviewing the album for NME, Sophie Williams found it to be "as in tune with the textures of today's forward-thinking rock as much as it is a love letter to Paramore's brilliantly caustic early days", with "some of their most fearless songwriting to date" and the band having "uncovered a new warmth". Arielle Gordon of Pitchfork wrote that "Instead of regurgitating the gnarled mall punk of their previous records", Paramore "reach for the propulsive sounds of post-punk" on the album, but found it to be "front-loaded with [...] lyrical missteps and ironies that would make Alanis Morissette roll her eyes" and the anger displayed in the lyrics "too lazy and too late". Giselle Au-Nhien Nguyen of The Sydney Morning Herald described the album as a "reintroduction to a band that's back with a new maturity and sense of purpose." Chris Thiessen of Under the Radar noted that the album "suffers slightly from front-loading imbalance" but still felt that the album was "well executed...and offers a glimpse into the ways we've all had to deal with the universal and the particular simultaneously in these last few years."

Track listing 
All tracks written by Hayley Williams, Taylor York, and Zac Farro. All tracks produced by Carlos de la Garza.

Personnel 
Credits retrieved from album's liner notes.

Paramore
 Hayley Williams – vocals, percussion, piano, recording (all tracks), backing vocals (track 1)
 Taylor York – guitars, keyboards, programming, vibraphone, glockenspiel, recording (all tracks), backing vocals (1)
 Zac Farro – drums, percussion, keyboards, programming, vibraphone, glockenspiel, recording (all tracks), backing vocals (1,2,4)

Additional musicians
 Carlos de la Garza – production (all tracks), backing vocals (1)
 Brian Robert Jones – bass guitar
 Henry Solomon – bass clarinet, clarinet, flute, alto flute
 Phil Danyew – keyboards, programming
 Elke – backing vocals (5)

Technical
 Melissa Mancini – mastering
 Manny Marroquin – mixing
 Harriet Tam – engineering
 Zach Pereya – mixing assistance
 Anthony Vilchis – mixing assistance
 Trey Station – mixing assistance
 Scott Moore – engineering assistance
 Kyle McAulay – engineering assistance
 Patrick Kehrier – engineering assistance
 Joey Mullen – drum technician
 Erik Bailey – guitar technician
 Joanne Almeida – guitar technician

Artwork
 Iamsound – art direction
 Zachary Gray – photography
 Fisk – graphic design

Charts

Release history

References 

2023 albums
Albums produced by Carlos de la Garza (music producer)
Atlantic Records albums
Dance-punk albums
Paramore albums
Post-punk albums by American artists